The Taiwan Blackfoot Disease Socio-Medical Service Memorial House is a former clinic building in Yonglong Village, Beimen District, Tainan, Taiwan.

History
The memorial house used to be a clinic for Wang King-ho, a doctor who had fought the adverse effects of "blackfoot disease" (arsenic poisoning) for 25 years by offering free medical services to patients from Beimen and the surrounding regions. Tainan County Magistrate Su Huan-chih and Department of Cultural Affairs Commissioner Ye Tzer-shan then proposed for the reconstruction of the clinic into a memorial house to preserve the history of the disease in Taiwan. Construction began in November 2006 and ended in September 2007. It was then opened by President Chen Shui-bian in end of September of the same year. After inauguration, the memorial house was taken over by the Wang King-ho Culture and Arts Foundation.

See also
 List of tourist attractions in Taiwan

References

External links

 

2007 establishments in Taiwan
Buildings and structures in Tainan
Clinics
Monuments and memorials in Taiwan
Tourist attractions in Tainan